The English Place-Name Society (EPNS) is a learned society concerned with toponomastics and the toponymy of England, in other words, the study of place-names (toponyms).

Its scholars aim to explain the origin and history of the names they study, taking into account factors such as the meaning of the elements out of which they were created (whether from the principal endemic tongues Old English, early Welsh, Danish, Norwegian, Cornish, Latin, Norman French – or others); the topography, geology and ecology of the places bearing the names; and the general and local history and culture of England.

History
In 1922 Professor Allen Mawer read a paper to the British Academy about setting up an English place-name survey. He obtained the formal and financial support of the Academy. Within a year he had brought into being a society composed of interested persons, provided it with a constitution and laid down the lines of its future conduct. The headquarters of the Society were first at the University of Liverpool, where Mawer was Professor of English Language. The publications of the Society began in 1924 with two volumes, a collection of essays and a dictionary of place-name elements. Mawer and Aileen Armstrong acted as General Editors for the annual volumes of county place-name surveys. Starting in 1929 JEB Gover collected material and was sub-editor of the volumes.

In 1929 Professor Mawer was appointed Provost of University College, London and the Society moved there at the end of the year. When World War II came the Society moved briefly to University College, Aberystwyth, back to London, and then to Stansted Bury, Stanstead Abbotts in east Hertfordshire. In July 1942 Sir Allen Mawer died, and Sir Frank Stenton became General Editor. The Society moved to the University of Reading until 1946. When Professor Bruce Dickins succeeded as Honorary Director the Society moved to the University of Cambridge, and Miss Margaret Midgley (later Dr Margaret Gelling) was appointed Research Assistant.

When Professor Hugh Smith assumed the position of Honorary Director in 1951, University College, London became once more the Society's headquarters, with Margaret Midgley continuing research there until 1953. Hugh Smith produced two new "Elements" volumes and 14 others on county place-names. On his death in 1967 Professor Kenneth Cameron became Honorary Director and the Society's offices were split between London and Nottingham, where the university provided room for the Library and Archives, as well as the services of a secretary. In 1972 the Society moved completely to Nottingham where it remains at the Centre for Name Studies. Victor Watts became Honorary Director in 1992 until his death in 2002 when he was succeeded by Professor Richard Coates.

The Survey has been consistently supported, morally and practically, by the British Academy; and from 2005 to 2010 was supported by a large grant from the Arts and Humanities Research Council.

Research breakthroughs
From the 1960s detailed comparison of distributions of the place-name types which had been thought to be early Saxon – and of archaeological evidence – has produced a re-written interpretation of some. The net effect, statistically, has been to find an original bias towards Anglo-Saxon. This means more names re-attributed, than the reverse, have been shown to be more likely Celtic. In particular, Kenneth Jackson contributed to much of the research, identification and morphology of Celtic names.

Publications

Traditional county or county subdivision publications
The Society divides England firstly by  traditional counties. The vast majority (or more convenient subdivisions) are sequentially covered in 91 volumes of the Survey of English Place-Names but whose early volumes are less detailed. These are used mainly by scholars and academia. The volumes for the North and East Ridings of Yorkshire and parts of the West Riding are available free of charge on the society's website. In 2016, the Society published its first volume in the "Popular Series", on the county of Suffolk.

Other publications
By 2018 the society had published a range of other books and booklets by category (e.g. field-names), and some county dictionaries aimed mainly at a non-specialist audience.

The Society is publishing a 2010s series of booklets on place-name elements, running in to the 2020s.

Since 1969, the Society has published an annual Journal, which contains essays on various place-name topics.

Substantial citation
EPNS material was used as the basis of The Cambridge Dictionary of English Place-Names, published in 2004.

See also
 English toponymy
 Scottish Place-Name Society
 Ainmean-Àite na h-Alba 
 Society for Name Studies in Britain and Ireland
 International Council of Onomastic Sciences
 Rude Britain, a book of selected British toponymy
 Richard Coates
 Eilert Ekwall
 Oliver Padel

References

Bibliography

External links
 
 
 

1923 establishments in England
Archaeological organizations
English toponymy
Learned societies of the United Kingdom
Organisations based in England
Organizations established in 1923